Murilo Bustamante (born 30 July 1966, in Rio de Janeiro) is a retired Brazilian mixed martial artist and former UFC Middleweight Champion. He is one of the founders of the Brazilian Top Team and is the current leader. In addition to competing for the UFC, he has also fought in PRIDE, making it to the Pride Shockwave 2005 Final, and also fought in Yarennoka!

Background 
Bustamante was born in coastal Rio de Janeiro and originally had dreams of professional surfing, but began training in Brazilian jiu-jitsu soon after having his first fight when he was 10 years old. He began officially competing when he was 15, before adding judo, and then began boxing when he was 18. He is a black belt under the renowned Carlson Gracie. He has won numerous world titles in Brazilian Jiu-Jitsu, which includes the World Championships of Jiu-Jitsu.

Instructor lineage 
Kano Jigoro → Tomita Tsunejiro → Mitsuyo "Count Koma" Maeda → Carlos Gracie, Sr. → Carlson Gracie → Murilo Bustamante

Sports accomplishments 
Murilo's grappling accomplishments include Championships at the World Class level, as well as appearances at the ADCC World Submission Wrestling Championships. In Brazilian Jiu-Jitsu, he has won The Mundials World Championships in 1999 and has won the Brazilian National Championship 4 times.

In ADCC, he competed at the 88–98 kg in both 1999 and 2000, and the Absolute tournament in 1999. He managed a record of 3–2 with his losses coming by way of points over submission.

UFC career
Bustamante signed a four-fight deal with the UFC and faced Yoji Anjo in his promotional debut at UFC 25 on 14 April 2000. He won the debut via second-round submission.

He then moved up to light heavyweight to face future champion Chuck Liddell at UFC 33 on 28 September 2001. He lost the fight via unanimous decision which was hotly contested.

After the controversial loss, Bustamante decided to move back to middleweight division, receiving an immediate title shot against reigning champion Dave Menne at UFC 35 on 11 January 2002. He claimed the championship via second-round technical knockout.

As the final fight of his contract and the first title defense, Bustamante faced Matt Lindland at UFC 37 on 10 May 2002. Lindland allegedly tapped to an armbar in the first round and referee McCarthy waved the bout off. Lindland immediately claimed that he did not tap out and McCarthy resumed the once-finished bout. Eventually, Bustamante submitted Lindland in the third round and successfully defended his title.

Bustamante was offered a new contract by the UFC, with a permission to entertain other offers as a free agent. However, when finding out UFC had the best offer on the market and returned to negotiations with them, the organization had lowered their offer to a level preceding the Lindland fight.

Post-UFC career
Bustamante ended up signing with PRIDE in 2003.

He was a finalist of the PRIDE Welterweight Tournament 2005 on 31 December. After two impressive victories via an armbar and a TKO, defeating Ikuhisa Minowa and Masanori Suda respectively, Bustamante entered the finals against Dan Henderson. In the finals, Bustamante dropped an extremely close split decision to the two-time PRIDE champion.

Murilo dedicates his time to teach Brazilian jiu-jitsu, submission grappling and MMA to his students for all levels at Brazilian Top Team training camps, as well as seminars all over the world.

Murilo was scheduled to fight at Superior Challenge 6 and would have faced Tor Troeng.

Bustamante was scheduled to face Yuya Shirai at Clube da Luta on 20 July 2011 but had to pull out of the fight due to an unspecified injury.

Grappling credentials 
ADCC World Submission Wrestling Championships

ADCC 2000
88–98 kg: 1st round

ADCC 1999
88–98 kg: Semi finals. (Note: Murilo defeated Ricardo Almeida by points, but was unable to continue the tournament.)
Absolute: Quarter finals.

Record of opponents:

 Won:, Dexter Casey (sub), Ivan Salaverry (pts), Ricardo Almeida (pts),
 Lost: Mike Van Arsdale (pts), Ricco Rodriguez (pts)

CBJJ World Championships

1999
Black Belt Pesado: 1st Place

1998
Black Belt Pesado: 3rd Place
Black Belt Absolute: 3rd Place

1996
Black Belt Pesado: 2nd Place

Championships and accomplishments 
 MMAFighting
 2002 Middleweight Fighter of the Year
 PRIDE Fighting Championships
 2005 PRIDE Welterweight Grand Prix Runner Up
 Ultimate Fighting Championship
 UFC Middleweight Championship (1 Time)
 One successful title defense
 First ever Brazilian titleholder in UFC history

Mixed martial arts record 

|-
| Win
| align=center| 15–8–1
| Dave Menne
| Decision (Unanimous)
| AFC - Amazon Forest Combat 2
| 
| align=center| 3
| align=center| 5:00
| Manaus, Brazil
| 
|-
| Loss
| align=center| 14–8–1
| Jesse Taylor
| TKO (Retirement)
| Impact FC 2 - The Uprising: Sydney
| 
| align=center| 2
| align=center| 2:10
| Sydney, Australia
| 
|-
| Loss
| align=center| 14–7–1
| Makoto Takimoto
| Decision (split)
| Yarennoka - New Year's Eve 2007
| 
| align=center| 2
| align=center| 5:00
| Saitama, Japan
| 
|-
| Win
| align=center| 14–6–1
| Ryuta Sakurai
| KO (punch)
| Deep: 29 Impact
| 
| align=center| 1
| align=center| 3:50
| Tokyo, Japan
| 
|-
| Win
| align=center| 13–6–1
| Dong Sik Yoon
| Decision (unanimous)
| Pride - Bushido 13
| 
| align=center| 2
| align=center| 5:00
| Yokohama, Japan
| 
|-
| Loss
| align=center| 12–6–1
| Amar Suloev
| Decision (unanimous)
| Pride - Bushido 11
| 
| align=center| 2
| align=center| 5:00
| Saitama, Japan
| 
|-
| Loss
| align=center| 12–5–1
| Dan Henderson
| Decision (split)
| Pride Shockwave 2005
| 
| align=center| 2
| align=center| 5:00
| Saitama, Japan
| 
|-
| Win
| align=center| 12–4–1
| Ikuhisa Minowa
| TKO (punches and soccer kicks)
| Pride Bushido 9
| 
| align=center| 1
| align=center| 9:51
| Tokyo, Japan
| 
|-
| Win
| align=center| 11–4–1
| Masanori Suda
| Submission (armbar)
| Pride Bushido 9
| 
| align=center| 1
| align=center| 3:20
| Tokyo, Japan
| 
|-
| Win
| align=center| 10–4–1
| Ryuta Sakurai
| Decision (unanimous)
| Pride Bushido 6
| 
| align=center| 2
| align=center| 5:00
| Yokohama, Japan
| 
|-
| Loss
| align=center| 9–4–1
| Kazuhiro Nakamura
| Decision (unanimous)
| Pride Final Conflict 2004
| 
| align=center| 3
| align=center| 5:00
| Saitama, Japan
| 
|-
| Loss
| align=center| 9–3–1
| Dan Henderson
| TKO (punches)
| Pride Final Conflict 2003
| 
| align=center| 1
| align=center| 0:53
| Tokyo, Japan
| 
|-
| Loss
| align=center| 9–2–1
| Quinton Jackson
| Decision (split)
| Pride Total Elimination 2003
| 
| align=center| 3
| align=center| 5:00
| Saitama, Japan
| 
|-
| Win
| align=center| 9–1–1
| Matt Lindland
| Submission (guillotine choke)
| UFC 37
| 
| align=center| 3
| align=center| 1:33
| Bossier City, Louisiana, United States
| 
|-
| Win
| align=center| 8–1–1
| Dave Menne
| TKO (punches)
| UFC 35
| 
| align=center| 2
| align=center| 0:44
| Uncasville, Connecticut, United States
| 
|-
| Loss
| align=center| 7–1–1
| Chuck Liddell
| Decision (unanimous)
| UFC 33
| 
| align=center| 3
| align=center| 5:00
| Las Vegas, Nevada, United States
| 
|-
| Win
| align=center| 7–0–1
| Sanae Kikuta
| Decision (unanimous)
| Pancrase - Trans 6
| 
| align=center| 1
| align=center| 15:00
| Tokyo, Japan
| 
|-
| Win
| align=center| 6–0–1
| Yoji Anjo
| Submission (arm-triangle choke)
| UFC 25
| 
| align=center| 2
| align=center| 0:31
| Tokyo, Japan
| 
|-
| Win
| align=center| 5–0–1
| Jerry Bohlander
| KO (upkick)
| Pentagon Combat
| 
| align=center| 1
| align=center| 5:38
| Brazil
| 
|-
| Draw
| align=center| 4–0–1
| Tom Erikson
| Draw
| Martial Arts Reality Superfighting
| 
| align=center| 1
| align=center| 40:00
| Birmingham, Alabama, United States
| 
|-
| Win
| align=center| 4–0
| Juan Mott
| TKO (submission to punches)
| Martial Arts Reality Superfighting
| 
| align=center| 1
| align=center| 1:08
| Birmingham, Alabama, United States
| 
|-
| Win
| align=center| 3–0
| Chris Haseman
| TKO (corner stoppage)
| Martial Arts Reality Superfighting
| 
| align=center| 1
| align=center| 1:01
| Birmingham, Alabama, United States
| 
|-
| Win
| align=center| 2–0
| Joe Charles
| Submission (arm-triangle choke)
| Universal Vale Tudo Fighting 2
| 
| align=center| 1
| align=center| 3:08
| Brazil
| 
|-
| Win
| align=center| 1–0
| Marcelo Mendes
| TKO (injury)
| Desafio-Jiu-Jitsu vs. Luta Livre
| 
| align=center| 1
| align=center| 4:42
| Rio de Janeiro, Brazil
|

References

External links 
 
 

1966 births
Living people
Brazilian male mixed martial artists
Brazilian practitioners of Brazilian jiu-jitsu
Brazilian jiu-jitsu trainers
Brazilian catch wrestlers
Brazilian people of Spanish descent
Middleweight mixed martial artists
Mixed martial artists utilizing catch wrestling
Mixed martial artists utilizing boxing
Mixed martial artists utilizing Luta Livre
Mixed martial artists utilizing judo
Mixed martial artists utilizing Brazilian jiu-jitsu
Ultimate Fighting Championship male fighters
Ultimate Fighting Championship champions
Sportspeople from Rio de Janeiro (city)
People awarded a coral belt in Brazilian jiu-jitsu